This list of manga awards is an index to articles about notable awards for manga, comics or graphic novels created in Japan or using the Japanese language and conforming to a style developed in Japan in the late 19th century.

Awards

See also

 Lists of awards
 List of media awards
 List of comics awards

References

 
Lists of awards